Special Forces: World's Toughest Test is an American reality quasi-military training television series that premiered on Fox on January 4, 2023. It is an adaptation of the British reality series SAS: Who Dares Wins.

Format

Production
On September 7, 2022, it was announced that Fox had ordered the series, originally titled Special Forces: The Ultimate Test, with Sophie Leonard, Alicia Kerr and Becky Clarke as the executive producers. The series premiered on January 4, 2023. Special Forces: World's Toughest Test season 1 was filmed in Jordan (Wadi Rum Desert).

Cast
The Directing Staff (DS) instructors are: Rudy Reyes, a former United States Recon Marine; Jason Fox, a former SBS operator; Mark 'Billy' Billingham, an ex-SAS Sergeant Major and Remi Adeleke, a veteran Navy SEAL Senior Chief. Season 1 was narrated by Shaun Dooley.

Cast progress

 the contestant voluntarily withdrew from the competition 
 the contestant medically withdrew from the competition
 the contestant was safe
 the contestant was disqualified
 the contestant won the competition

Episodes

Ratings

References

External links

2020s American reality television series
2023 American television series debuts
American military television series
American television series based on British television series
English-language television shows
Fox Broadcasting Company original programming
Reality competition television series